Herpetogramma bipunctalis, the southern beet webworm moth or two-spotted herpetogramma,  is a species of moth in the family Crambidae. It is found from New England to Florida, west to Texas and north to Illinois. In the south, the range extends through Central America and the Caribbean to South America.

The wingspan is about 23 mm. The forewings are light yellowish-brown with two black discal spots. The hindwings are similar in colour, but have only one discal spot and an irregular median line.

The larvae feed on various aquatic plants, including Alternanthera philoxeroides.

References

Moths described in 1794
Herpetogramma
Moths of North America
Moths of South America